meta-Methoxyamphetamine (MMA), also known as 3-methoxyamphetamine (3-MA), is a stimulant drug from the amphetamine family. It has similar effects in animal drug discrimination tests to the more widely known derivative 4-methoxyamphetamine (PMA), although with a slightly different ratio of monoamine release, being a combined serotonin, dopamine, and norepinephrine releasing agent rather than a fairly selective serotonin releaser like PMA. 3-Methoxyamphetamine has similarly appeared on the illicit market as a designer drug alternative to MDMA, although far more rarely than its infamous positional isomer. It produces gepefrine, a cardiac stimulant, as one of its major metabolites.

See also 
 2-Methoxyamphetamine (OMA)
 3-Methylamphetamine (3-MA)
 3-Fluoroamphetamine (3-FA)
 3-Trifluoromethylamphetamine (Norfenfluramine)
 3-Methoxy-4-methylamphetamine (MMA)
 3-Methoxymethamphetamine (MMMA)
 4-Ethoxyamphetamine (4-ETA)

References 

Substituted amphetamines
Phenol ethers
Serotonin-norepinephrine-dopamine releasing agents